Lee Jeloscek is an Australian journalist. He is a former reporter for Seven News  in Sydney.

Career 
His career began in 1999, working at The Advertiser newspaper in Adelaide. He maintained his position there for nearly five years. 
He also worked in London. Jeloscek started working as a court reporter with Seven News in Sydney in 2003. 

As part of a team of four Seven journalists, Jeloscek won the prestigious Walkley Award for Television News Reporting, for a story on NSW Government support of ethanol. In 2014, he was nominated for a Kennedy Award  in the category of outstanding political reporting.

While In 2016, he became the first Sydney journalist to do a live cross from inside a bus.

Personal life 
Jeloscek grew up in Adelaide, Australia. He married Sally Cummine on 4 October 2015 in Killcare, New South Wales. They met in 2010 at NSW Parliament House.

Controversies
On 19 May 2011, Jeloscek was hung up on during a phone interview with popular shock jock Ray Hadley on Sydney radio station 2GB. Hadley took offence that Jeloscek wanted to correct something he asserted was suggested on-air before the interview began, and Hadley cut off Jeloscek mid-sentence.

Chief of staff to then Finance Minister Greg Pearce, Jo McCafferty, was involved in an altercation with Jeloscek at a drinks function in which a "dishevelled" McCafferty called Jeloscek a "bottom feeder". The incident reportedly related to a recent Seven News story criticising Greg Pearce.

References

Australian journalists
Living people
Year of birth missing (living people)